Ardeadoris symmetrica is a species of sea slug, a dorid nudibranch, a shell-less marine gastropod mollusk in the family Chromodorididae.

Distribution 
This species is found in the tropical Indo-West Pacific Ocean. The type specimen was found in the Indian Ocean off Réunion.

References

Chromodorididae
Gastropods described in 1990